This is a list of defunct airlines of Vietnam.

See also
 List of airlines of Vietnam
 List of airports in Vietnam

References

Vietnam
Airlines
Airlines, defunct